The women's 4 × 100 metre freestyle relay event at the 1980 Summer Olympics was held on 27 July at the Swimming Pool at the Olimpiysky Sports Complex.

Records
Prior to this competition, the existing world and Olympic records were as follows.

The following records were established during the competition:

Results

Heats

 The Soviet Union was disqualified in the heats for an improper changeover.

Final

References

Swimming at the 1980 Moskva Summer Games: Women's 4 x 100 metres Freestyle Relay. Sports Reference. Retrieved 2020-04-12.

R
1980 in women's swimming
Women's events at the 1980 Summer Olympics